The Feast of All Saints of Russia, also known as The Feast Day of All Russian Saints Resplendent in the Russian land, is a day of remembrance celebrated in the Russian Orthodox Church on the second Sunday after Pentecost. It is dedicated to all Russian Orthodox saints: those who are canonized, and those whose deeds are unknown.

History

Origins 

The monk Dositheus Toporkov, nephew of Joseph of Volokolamsk, was working on a revision of the Sinai Patericon in 1528–1529 with the blessing of Archbishop Macarius of Novgorod (later Metropolitan of Moscow and all Rus). He wrote in an afterword that although Russia had holy men and women as worthy of veneration as the eastern saints of early Christianity, "because of our negligence, [they are] left without proper attention and are not recorded in the written works, some [of them] we ourselves know" (11, 74, 12, 275).

Macarius is noted for collecting and systematizing Orthodox Russia's hagiographic, hymnal and homiletic heritage. He and his assistants worked from 1529 to 1541 on the Great Menaion Reader, a twelve-volume work detailing the lives of many Russian saints who were regionally revered but not generally recognized by the church. The reader, compiled on a calendar basis with biographies of many Russian ascetics, accelerated the process of venerating many Russian Orthodox saints.

Macarius councils 

After becoming Metropolitan of all Rus' in 1542, Macarius convened councils in Moscow in 1547 and 1549 to consider the glorification of Russian saints. Thirty (or thirty-one) church-wide saints and nine locally-venerated saints were canonized at the councils. The issue of future canonization was also resolved, with veneration now subject to the church's collective judgment.

Church-wide saints glorified by the 1547 council include:
 Jonah, Metropolitan of Moscow and All Russia (died 1461)
 John, Archbishop of Novgorod (died 1186)
 Macarius of Kalyazin (died 1483)
 Paphnutius of Borovsk (died 1477)
 Alexander Nevsky (died 1263)
 Nikon of Radonezh (died 1426)
 Paul of Komel and Obnora (died 1429)
 Michael of Klopsk (died 1456)
 Sabbas of Storozhi (died 1406)
 Zosimas (died 1478) and 
 Sabbatius of Solovki (died 1435) of Solovki
 Dionysius of Glushitsa (died 1437)
 Alexander of Svir (died 1533)

Saints identified for local veneration by the council include:
 Blessed Maximus of Moscow (died 1434)
 Constantine of Murom and his children, Michael and Theodore (died 1129)
 Peter and Fevronia of Murom (died 1228)
 Arsenius of Tver (died 1409)
 Blessed Procopius (died 1303) and John of Ustyug (died 1494)

Church-wide saints glorified by the 1549 council reportedly include:
 Niphon, Archbishop of Novgorod (died 1156)
 Jonah (died 1470) and Euthymius (died 1458) of Novgorod
 James, Bishop of Rostov (died 1392)
 Stephen of Perm (died 1396)
 Vsevolod of Pskov (died 1138)
 Michael of Tver (died 1318)
 Abraham of Smolensk (died  1222)
 John, Eustace, and Anthony of Lithuania (died 1347)
 Euthymius of Suzdal (died 1404)
 Gregory of Pelshema (died 1442)
 Sabbas of Vishera (died 1460)
 Euphrosyne of Pskov (died 1481)
 Ephraim of Perekom (died 1492)
 Abraham of Bulgaria (died 1229)
 Arsenius of Serbia (died 1266)

The 1547 council also established a day of remembrance for "new Russian miracle workers".

After the councils 

The Feast of All Saints of Russia was originally on July 17, near the commemoration of Vladimir the Great (July 15), but has changed several times. A feast for all Russian saints required a service, which was written by the monk Gregory of St. Euthymius monastery in Suzdal. Although Gregory's service was widely used in the 16th century, it was not published until the first half of the 18th century.

Neglect 
By the end of the 16th century, the feast was celebrated only in certain parts of Russia. This trend increased during the 17th century and the synodal period, and the feast was eventually preserved only by the Old Believers.

Nikolai Osipovich Gazukin, a peasant who lived in Sudogda, Vladimir Governorate, petitioned the Most Holy Synod on July 20, 1908 to establish an annual celebration of all Russian saints. Gazukin's request was denied because the synod believed that the existing feast of All Saints included all Russian saints.

1918 resumption 

Petrograd University professor  Boris Turaev and hieromonk Athanasius Sakharov wanted to restore the feast. Both were members of the 1917–18 Local Council of the Russian Orthodox Church. On March 15, 1918, Turaev appeared at a meeting to report his request to restore the feast. On August 20, 1918, Turaev's report was reviewed by the council on August 20 of that year and, on August 26, restored the feast; it would be celebrated on the first Sunday of Peter's Fast.

The council ruled that a revised, expanded version of Gregory's service should be published. Turaev and Athanasius determined that only a small part of the monk's service was still usable. New hymns were primarily composed by Turaev, and Athanasius selected prayers from services of Russian saints. On September 8, 1918, a partial new service was reviewed and approved by the Patriarch and the Holy Synod.

Soviet era 

On November 18, 1918, after the close of the local council, Patriarch Tikhon and the Holy Synod blessed the new service under the supervision of metropolitan Sergius Stragorodsky of Vladimir. Diocesan bishops were sent a December 13 decree restoring the feast and, on June 16, 1919, were sent a printed service to be used on the first Sunday after receipt. Turaev (who wanted to improve the hastily-composed service) died on July 23, 1920, and Athanasius, who became an archimandrite in 1920 and a bishop in 1921, felt unable to complete the task alone.

During his first imprisonment in fall 1922 in Vladimir prison, Bishop Athanasius met with 11 like-minded admirers of the restored holiday; they included Archbishop Nicander (Fenomenov) of Krutitsy, Archbishop Thaddeus (Uspensky) of Astrakhan, Bishop Cornelius (Sobolev) of Vyazniki, and Bishop Basil (Summer) of Suzdal. A revision of the 1918 service was agreed on, and the date of the feast became flexible. Hymns were changed, and new saints were added to the service. On November 10, 1922, the service was celebrated in the prison for the first time.

In solitary confinement at Taganka Prison, Bishop Athanasius consecrated the hidden antimins in honor of all Russian saints for his secret church on March 1, 1923. He decided that the service needed to be supplemented further and a second feast day designated: July 29, the day after the feast of Vladimir the Great.

The service was published by the Moscow Patriarchate in 1946, and the feast began to be widely celebrated. Bishop Athanasius, author of most of its chants, continued to work on the service until his death in 1962.

References

External links 
 
 
 

Russian saints